The 2022–23 Sheikh Jamal DC's season is the 12th competitive season in top-class football since club established in 2010. In addition the club will participate Federation Cup, Independence Cup and Super Cup.
The season covering period from 8 October 2022 to July 2023.

Current squad

Sheikh Jamal DC Squad for 2022–23 season.

Transfer

In

Out

Loans in

Competitions

Overall

Overview

Premier League

League table

Results summary

Results by round

Matches

Federation Cup

Group stages

Independence Cup

Group stages

Knockout stages

Super Cup

Group stages

Statistics

Goalscorers

Source: Matches

References

2022 in Bangladeshi football
2023 in Bangladeshi football
Football clubs in Bangladesh
2010 establishments in Bangladesh
Bangladeshi football club records and statistics
Sport in Dhaka